Deeper: The D:finitive Worship Experience is a double compilation album by the band Delirious?.

Track listing

Disc one
 "Did You Feel the Mountains Tremble? (New Version)" - 9:01
 "I Could Sing of Your Love Forever (New Version)" - 5:29
 "I've Found Jesus" - 4:54
 "I'm Not Ashamed" - 6:44
 "Deeper" - 4:19
 "Lord, You Have My Heart (New Version)" - 6:24
 "Sanctify" - 4:13
 "Not Forgotten (New Song)" - 5:32
 "Shout to the North" - 4:14
 "History Maker" - 6:37
 "Follow" - 4:40
 "All the Way" - 4:17
 "Kiss Your Feet" - 4:20

Disc two
 "The Happy Song (New Version)" - 4:30
 "Come Like You Promise" (New Version) - 3:58
 "Revival Town (New Version)" - 5:55
 "Hands of Kindness" - 4:44
 "Find Me in the River" - 5:08
 "Jesus' Blood" - 5:32
 "King of Love" - 2:47
 "Message of the Cross" - 4:46
 "Oh Lead Me" - 4:50
 "Obsession" - 8:33
 "Thank You for Saving Me" 7:01
 "What a Friend I've Found" - 5:28

Release history

References 

Delirious? albums
2002 compilation albums